Madrasa El Yusefiya is one of the madrasahs of the medina of Tunis.

Localization 

The madrasa was first built near the Kasbah. But after, it got transferred into another building in 29 Es Sabbaghine Street in the first floor of madrasa Es Sabbaghine.
Because of the accommodation crisis of Al-Zaytuna students in the twenties, the number of the students in this madrasah increased from 21 (which was the normal capacity of the madrasa) to 39 in 1930.

History 
During the Ottoman era in the end of the 16th century and in order to spread the Hanafi doctrine, the ottomans started use the Hafsid madrasahs that used to teach the Almohad doctrine and transform them. One of these madrasahs is Youssef Dey madrasa or Madrasa El Yusefiya.

Students
The poet Aboul-Qacem Echebbi was one of Madrasa El Yusefiya's students.
Also the students who were killed and harmed in 15 March 1954 were taken to this madrasa.

References 

	

El Yusefiya